Yevgeni Matveyev (born 23 August 1966) is a former Russian football player.

Honours
Neftchi FK Fergana
Uzbek League champion: 1992, 1993

References

1966 births
Living people
Soviet footballers
FK Neftchi Farg'ona players
Russian footballers
FC Spartak-UGP Anapa players
FC Lokomotiv Nizhny Novgorod players
Russian Premier League players
Russian expatriate footballers
Expatriate footballers in Uzbekistan
Association football midfielders
Association football forwards